Millesgården is an art museum and sculpture garden, located on the island of Lidingö in Stockholm, Sweden. It is located in the grounds of the former home of sculptor Carl Milles (1875–1955) and his wife, the artist Olga Milles (1874–1967). Millesgården consists of three main parts: the artists' former home, an art gallery, and a sculpture park.

History
In 1906, the artist couple Carl and Olga Milles bought a plot on Lidingö. The house was designed by architect Karl M. Bengtson (1878-1935) and inaugurated in 1908. Later renovations and extensions were done in collaboration with Milles's brother architect Evert Milles (1885-1960). They planned to build a home associated with art. At Millesgården the works are mainly by Carl Milles. At the entrance of the middle terrace is a  sculpture garden and another sculpture workshop, Lilla Ateljén. This was the primary residence of Carl and Olga Milles until 1931. In 1936, Millesgården was transformed into a foundation which was handed over as a gift to the Swedish people.

The Woodland chapel was added in the late 1940s and is the site of burial for Carl and Olga Milles. In the early 1950s, Anne's House was built after drawings by Evert Milles. The house was planned for Milles's secretary, Anne Hedmark (1899–1993), who in 1950 took up the post of Millesgarden's hostess and curator. She lived there until 1986.

The newest building on Millesgården is Millesgården Art Hall, which is located along one side of the lower terrace. The Millesgården Art Hall was designed by architect Johan Celsing and was inaugurated in October 1999.

Millesgården in popular culture 
Millesgården is the setting of the opening scene of Poul Anderson's 1970 science fiction novel Tau Zero, and several of the sculpture garden's works are described.

Gallery

Buildings at Millesgården

Interior

See also 
 List of museums in Stockholm
 List of single-artist museums

References

Other sources
Anders Bergström (2004) Millesgården - Arkitektur och trädgård (Stockholm: Atlantis)

External links 
 Millesgården website (in English and Swedish)

Art museums and galleries in Stockholm
Sculpture gardens, trails and parks in Sweden
Art museums established in 1936
1936 establishments in Sweden
Sculpture galleries in Sweden
Museums devoted to one artist